Sabah Al Ahmad Sea City  is a city in Ahmadi, Kuwait built with canals forming  of artificial shoreline. The city houses up to 250,000 residents. The city was inaugurated in mid 2016. The artificial islands that make up the area are unusual because they were built excavating large channels in desert land rather than using reclaimed land. The city is considered a pioneering project in the region due to its environmentally sustainable construction techniques.

The first phase of the project was opened to the sea in 2004. The multi-billion dollar development is within a 25-year construction period with ten phases. Sabah Al Ahmad Sea City is the first urban area in Kuwait built entirely by the private sector.

Wildlife
Recent reports demonstrate that Persian Gulf shellfish and finfish fisheries are in serious decline, in particular those of Kuwait. This decline is attributed to over fishing, pollution, loss of nursery ground, reduction in riverine input via the Shatt Al-Arab, and climate change. When completed in 2018, Sabah Al-Ahmad Sea City, Kuwait, will contain  of waterways providing over 50% of extra coast line for Kuwait. Seine netting and gargoor traps have been deployed annually, since the first phase (A1) of this coastal township was opened to the sea in 2004, to monitor Shell and Fin fish populations within the waterways. Present work describes the diversity and abundance of commercial (edible and potential ornamental value) species now inhabiting the waterways, which comprise over 60% of the species marketed in Kuwait. Analysis of catch data reveals that the waterways act as spawning, nursery and feeding habitats for important species such as Epinephelus coioides (Orange-Spotted Grouper), Penaeus semisulcatus (Banana Shrimp) and Portunus segnis (Blue Swimming Crab). As no commercial fishing is allowed, the Sea City waterways act as a significant conservation area for Kuwait's fish stocks.

Environmental impact
The environmental impact of the development, from the standpoint of marine life, has been seen as positive and sustainable. According to studies of the development:

Gallery

See also 
 Madinat al-Hareer
 Sheikh Jaber Al-Ahmad Al-Sabah Causeway
 Al Mutlaa City
 Mubarak Al Kabeer Port
 Kuwait National Cultural District

References

External links
 
 Discovery Channel documentary

Port cities and towns in Kuwait
Port cities and towns of the Persian Gulf
Artificial islands